This is an incomplete list of notable people who were born, were raised or lived in the Chinese city of Suzhou, or for whom Suzhou is a significant part of their identity.

List
Politicians
 Lu Xun (183–245) military general and politician of the state of Eastern Wu during the Three Kingdoms era
 Lu Kang (226–274) military general of the state of Eastern Wu during the Three Kingdoms era, the son of Lu Xun (Three Kingdoms)
Lu Jianzhi(585-638)
Lu Wan
 Fan Zhongyan (989-1052) politician and literary figure in Song dynasty
Xu Youzhen grand secretariat in Ming dynasty
Wang ao
Shen Shixing grand secretariat in Ming dynasty
Qu Shisi grand secretariat in Ming dynasty
Wen Zhenmeng
 Weng Tonghe (1830–1904) Chinese Confucian scholar and imperial tutor of the Tongzhi and Guangxu emperors in the late Qing dynasty
Lu Runxiang
 Feng Jun
 Yen Chia-kan (1905－1993), President (1975-1978), Republic of China
 Qian Dajun, General
 Jin Renqing Minister of Finance
 Yuan Weimin Chinese sports administrator

Poets and writers
  Lu Ji (Shiheng) (261–303) writer and literary critic of Eastern Wu during the Three Kingdoms period, the son of Lu Kang and grandson of Lu Xun (Three Kingdoms)
 Fan Chengda (1126-1193 AD)
 Qian Qianyi (1582–1664) late Ming official, scholar, poet and social historian, and along with Gong Dingzi and Wu Weiye was known as one of the Three Masters of Jiangdong
 Ye Shengtao (1894 — 1988) Writer, educator and publisher
Yu Yue(1821.12.25-1907.2.5)
 Yu Pingbo (1900–1990) Writer, historian and critic
 Gu Jiegang  (1893–1980) Historian
 Lu Wenfu() (1927-2005) Novelist and short story writer
 Su Tong (1963 -) Writer
Playwrights
 Feng Menglong (1574-1645 AD) vernacular writer and poet of the late Ming Dynasty
Artists
Zhang Yu 
 Zhang Rong 
 Zhang Xu 
 Zhang Sengyou famous Chinese painter in Liang Dynasty
 Shen Zhou Painter and poet of the Ming Dynasty, the founder of Wu School, one of Four Masters of the Ming Dynasty
 Tang Yin Painter, calligrapher, and poet of the Ming Dynasty, better known by his courtesy name Tang Bohu
 Cai Han Painter and calligrapher of the Qing Dynasty, known by her courtesy name Cai Nüluo
 Zhu Zhishan Painter, calligrapher
 Wen Zhengming Painter and poet of the Ming Dynasty, the founder of Wu School, one of Four Masters of the Ming Dynasty
 Wen Peng (1498-1573 AD) Painter, the son of Wen Zhengming
 Wen Jia (1501-1583 AD) Painter, Calligrapher
 Cai Yu (?-1541 AD) Calligrapher
 Wen Zhenheng (1585-1645 AD) Painter
 Kuai Xiang (1397-1481 AD) Architect and Engineer who is the designer of the Forbidden City.
 I. M. Pei (1917-2019) Architect
Xie Shichen (谢时臣) (1488-unknown) Landscape painter

Scientists and engineers
 Tsung-Dao Lee Physicist
 Chien-Shiung Wu Physicist
 Zhang Guangdou Expert on Water Conservancy and Hydroelectric Engineering
 Wang Ganchang Physicist
 M. T. Cheng Mathematician
 An Wang Computer Engineer and Inventor
 Feng Duan Physicist
 Yang Jiachi Space Automatic Control Scientist
 Cheng Kaijia Physicist
 Lee C. Lee Professor of psychology and Asian-American studies
 Pan Chengdong Mathematician
 Thomas Dao (1921–2009), physician who developed breast cancer treatment alternatives.
 Fei Xiaotong Social Scientist
 Huston Smith Religious studies scholar
Philosophers
 Gu Yanwu
 Zhang Taiyan
 Nan Huai-Chin Chan Buddhist teacher
Entertainment
 Fei Mu Movie director
 Wu Yonggang Movie director
 Josephine Siao Actress
 Xia Meng Actress
 Carina Lau Actress
 Li Shaohong Movie director
 Angela Pan Actress

Others
 Huang Peilie Bibliophile
 Zhu Xun, Chinese host
 Sun Tzu (孙武) Military General who wrote The Art of War (birthplace disputed)
 Lin Zhao Dissident
 Wang Shixian, Chinese female badminton player
 Fei Junlong, Chinese astronaut who flew on Shenzhou 6

References